Aictis is a genus of moths of the family Yponomeutidae.

Species
Aictis erythrozona - Turner, 1926

References

Yponomeutidae